Partial legislative elections were held in France on 4 and 13 November 1820.

Process
Only citizens paying taxes were eligible to vote. All electors elected three-fifths of all deputies in the first round. In the second round, the most heavily taxed voted again to elect the remaining two-fifths of deputies. Only around 94,000 people were eligible to vote.

Results

References

Legislative elections in France
France
Legislative
France